Ischnura heterosticta, one of at least two species with the common name common bluetail, is an Australian damselfly of the family Coenagrionidae.
It is the largest of the three Ischnura species in Australia.  They are generally found near slow-running or still water. The species is also salt tolerant. It flies from October to March.

Description
The common bluetail is a small damselfly. Most males have blue eyes, a blue thorax, and a blue ringed tail. The females have a variety of forms including green, brown, black, and a form with very similar colourings to the male.

Distribution
In Australia, Ischnura heterosticta is found throughout the entire continent including Tasmania.

Gallery

References

Ischnura
Odonata of Australia
Insects of Australia
Taxa named by Hermann Burmeister
Insects described in 1842
Damselflies